Probable maximum loss (PML) is a term used in the insurance industry as well as commercial real estate. Although the definition is not consistent in the insurance industry, it is generally defined as the value of the largest loss that could result from a disaster, assuming the normal functioning of passive protective features (e.g. firewalls, nonflammable materials, flood defences etc.) and proper functioning of most (perhaps not all) active suppression systems (e.g. sprinklers). This loss estimate is always less than (or in rare cases, equal to) the maximum foreseeable loss, which assumes the failure of all active protective features. Underwriting decisions can be influenced by PML evaluations, and the amount of reinsurance ceded on a risk can be predicated on the PML valuation.

PML estimation is also used to determine the extent of losses in Chemical & Petrochemical Industries. Insurers and Reinsurers across the world use PML to estimate loss during events such as vapour cloud explosions (VCE) or high pressure rupture (HPR).

Seismic
In the arena of commercial real estate due diligence, seismic PMLs can performed according to the scope published by the American Society of Testing Materials (ASTM) Standard E 2026-07.  Most seismic PMLs are conducted by registered structural engineers (SE) and include on-site inspection or building plan review, although some lower level reviews are performed by non-registered engineers or professional engineers (PE) with general due-diligence experience.

Background:  
Engineering studies on existing buildings originally only addressed the potential risk to life-safety (i.e. collapse) as the buildings were compared to current building code requirements.  However, due to the need for understanding the potential losses associated with a building, crude loss estimation techniques were developed in the 1970s.  Additional methods for estimating seismic losses were developed in the 1980s (ATC-13) and continue to be developed and refined today.

Along the way, the term probable maximum loss (or PML) came into use, but had many different definitions based on the risk tolerance of various lenders and owners.  Other entities, recognizing the need to limit seismic risk while remaining competitive also adopted “PML” policies which were less defined.  The lack of a precise definition has resulted in confusion in the industry and lack of any “standards”.

In 1999, ASTM E2026 was produced in order to “standardize” the nomenclature for seismic loss estimation, as well as establish some guidelines as to the level of review and qualifications of the reviewer.  The document was updated in 2016.  The ASTM document recommends the discontinued use of PML, and the use of new nomenclature: Scenario Expected Loss (SEL), Scenario Upper Loss (SUL), and Probable Loss (PL).

The ASTM guidelines specify four "levels" of investigation (hereinafter called review), designated as Level 0 through 3.  Level 0 is a desktop review, where the reviewer may not even visit the site, while Level 3 is in-depth.  Requirements for the scope of work and qualifications of reviewer are provided within the document.  The guidelines also require two major items to be addressed; loss estimation and building stability. In current practice, most Level 0 reports provide loss estimation values, but do not address building stability (i.e. collapse potential).

References 

Insurance